Fort Bunker Hill was one of seven temporary earthwork forts part of the Civil War Defenses of Washington, D.C., during the Civil War built in the Northeast quadrant of the city at the beginning of the Civil War by the Union Army to protect the city from the Confederate Army. From west to east, the forts were: Fort Slocum, Fort Totten, Fort Slemmer, Fort Bunker Hill, Fort Saratoga, Fort Thayer and Fort Lincoln. Unlike other forts, today very little remains of the structure.

Civil War
The fort was built in the fall of 1861 by soldiers from the 11th Regiment Massachusetts Volunteer Infantry on land owned by Henry Quinn and was named after the Battle of Bunker Hill of 1775 in Charlestown, Boston, Massachusetts. It was located between Fort Slemmer and Fort Saratoga and was intended to assist in the defense of the northeast approaches to Washington between Fort Totten and Fort Lincoln.

Company F of the 11th Vermont Infantry Regiment was assigned to Fort Bunker Hill to assist in the defense of the city until November 17, 1862. 
Thirteen guns were mounted in the rectangular-shaped fort, which operated until the conclusion of hostilities in 1865.

The following armament was assigned to Fort Bunker Hill:
 Eight 32-pounder James rifle (barbette)
 One 8-inch siege howitzer
 One Coehorn mortar
 One 10-inch siege mortar M. 1841
 One 4-inch ordnance
 Two 30-pounder Parrotts

The following troops garrisoned at Fort Bunker Hill:
 11th Regiment Massachusetts Volunteer Infantry
 Company B, Main Coast Guards
 Detachment 2d Company, New Hampshire Heavy Artillery
 150th Ohio National Guard
 Battery G, 3rd United States Artillery

A supporting field battery stood a few yards to the North.

Post Civil War
The site of the fort is bounded by 14th, Otis, 13th, and Perry Streets in Northeast DC. Today, little remains of the fort, and the site is maintained by the National Park Service.

A marker by the National Park Service commemorates the Fort:
Fort Bunker Hill

One of the Civil War Defenses of Washington erected in the fall of 1861, Fort Bunker Hill occupied an important position between Fort Totten and Fort Lincoln in the defense of the National Capital. Thirteen guns and mortars were mounted in the fort. 

United States Department of the Interior
National Park Service

A nearby road was named Bunker Hill Road after the fort, but it was later renamed Michigan Avenue.

See also

 Civil War Defenses of Washington
 Washington, D.C., in the American Civil War
 Fort Slocum
 Fort Totten
 Fort Slemmer
 Fort Saratoga
 Fort Thayer
 Fort Lincoln
 Battle of Fort Stevens

References

External links 
National Park Service Fort Bunker Hill Page

Bunker Hill, Fort
Bunker Hill, Fort
Bunker Hill
Bunker
American Civil War on the National Register of Historic Places
Parks in Washington, D.C.
Demolished buildings and structures in Washington, D.C.
Washington, D.C., in the American Civil War
Military installations established in 1861
Military installations closed in 1865
1861 establishments in Washington, D.C.
1865 disestablishments in Washington, D.C.
Brookland (Washington, D.C.)